Umvoti Local Municipality is an administrative area in the Umzinyathi District of KwaZulu-Natal in South Africa. 

The municipality is named after the Umvoti River, which runs from the west to the east towards the Indian Ocean. The municipality is situated nearer the mouth of the river.

Greytown, a small but vibrant town, is the main provider of higher income jobs in senior management, professional, technical, clerks, service related and skilled, providing 26.8% of all jobs in the Umvoti area. The manufacturing sector makes the second largest contribution to the local economy. There is limited economic activity taking place within the traditional authority areas.

Main places
The 2001 census divided the municipality into the following main places:

Politics 

The municipal council consists of twenty-seven members elected by mixed-member proportional representation. Fourteen councillors are elected by first-past-the-post voting in fourteen wards, while the remaining thirteen are chosen from party lists so that the total number of party representatives is proportional to the number of votes received. 

In the election of 1 November 2021 the African National Congress (ANC) lost its majority, obtaining a plurality of ten seats on the council.
The following table shows the results of the election.

By-elections from November 2021
The following by-elections were held to fill vacant ward seats in the period from the election in November 2021.

References

External links
 Official website

Local municipalities of the Umzinyathi District Municipality